The following table lists the 272 Colorado municipalities arranged by county and population.


Table
The table below presents the following information:
The rank of the county within the state by population as of July 1, 2018, as estimated by the U.S. Census Bureau.
The official name of the county.
The county population as of July 1, 2018, as estimated by the U.S. Census Bureau.
The county population as a percentage of the Colorado state population as of July 1, 2018, as estimated by the U.S. Census Bureau.
The rank of the municipality within the county by population within the county as of July 1, 2018, as estimated by the U.S. Census Bureau.
The official name of the municipality.  The county seat is shown in bold. If the municipality extends beyond the county, the percentage of the municipal population that resides within the county is shown.
The municipal population within the county as of July 1, 2018, as estimated by the U.S. Census Bureau.
The municipal population within the county as a percentage of the county population as of July 1, 2018, as estimated by the U.S. Census Bureau.
A map showing the location of the county within the State of Colorado.

See also

State of Colorado
Colorado statistical areas
Geography of Colorado
Geology of Colorado
History of Colorado
Index of Colorado-related articles
List of census-designated places in Colorado
List of cities and towns in Colorado
List of adjectivals and demonyms for Colorado cities
List of city nicknames in Colorado
List of Colorado municipalities by county
Commons:Category:Cities in Colorado
List of counties in Colorado
Commons:Category:Counties of Colorado
List of forts in Colorado
List of ghost towns in Colorado
List of places in Colorado
Outline of Colorado
United States Census Bureau
United States Census 2020

References

External links
State of Colorado
Department of Local Affairs

 
 
 
Local government in Colorado
Municipalities by county